The Berlin Airlift Device is miniature gold airplane that was awarded for wear on occupation medals and ribbons issued to United States Armed Forces service personnel for participation in or in direct support of, the Berlin airlift during the Cold War.

History
The Berlin Airlift Device is awarded for service of 92 consecutive days with a unit credited with participation in the Berlin airlift, or by competent field authority on an individual basis within the period June 26, 1948 to September 30, 1949 inclusive. U.S. Army orders announcing award of the Berlin Airlift device will specifically award the Army of Occupation Medal to persons otherwise not eligible therefor. The device is a gold colored metal miniature of a Douglas C-54 cargo airplane.  It is worn centered on the suspension and service ribbon of the Army of Occupation Medal or Navy Occupation Service Medal. When worn on the suspension ribbon, the device is pinned above the Germany medal clasp.

Those awarded the Army of Occupation Medal or Navy Occupation Service Medal and the Berlin Airlift Device may also be entitled to the Medal for Humane Action awarded for at least 120 days of service or direct support thereof of the Berlin airlift. The 31 American service personnel and one Army civilian worker of the 101 persons who lost their lives mostly due to plane crashes during the Berlin airlift were awarded the Medal of Humane Action posthumously.

See also
 United States military award devices
 Awards and decorations of the United States military
 Berlin Airlift Historical Foundation
 DA Pamphlet 672-1, page 533 for the list of Army units entitled to the Berlin Airlift Device

References

Devices and accouterments of United States military awards
Device